Paralaoma is a genus of very small air-breathing land snails, terrestrial pulmonate gastropod mollusks or micromollusks in the subfamily Laominae  of the family Punctidae, the dot snails.

Species
The genus Paralaoma includes the following species:

 Paralaoma ahena Iredale, 1945
 Paralaoma allochroida (Suter, 1890)
 Paralaoma ambigua Iredale, 1913
 Paralaoma angusta Vermeulen, Liew & Schilthuizen, 2015
 Paralaoma annabelli Shea & Griffiths, 2010
 Paralaoma buddlei Powell, 1951
 Paralaoma burringtoni (Pilsbry, 1930)
 Paralaoma coloba (Pilsbry, 1894)
 Paralaoma compar Iredale, 1944
 Paralaoma depressior Preston, 1913
 Paralaoma gelida Iredale, 1941
 Paralaoma goweri Iredale, 1944
 Paralaoma hottentota (Melvill & Ponsonby, 1891)
 Paralaoma innesi Iredale, 1944
 Paralaoma insularis (Cotton, 1939)
 Paralaoma lateumbilicata (Suter, 1890)
 Paralaoma manawatawhia Goulstone & Brook, 1999
 Paralaoma mazatlanica (L. Pfeiffer, 1856)
 Paralaoma miserabilis (Iredale, 1913)
 Paralaoma morti (Cox, 1864)
 Paralaoma pagoda Climo, 1973
 Paralaoma perminuta Preston, 1913
 Paralaoma pilsbryi (Hylton Scott, 1957)
 Paralaoma raki Goulstone & Brook, 1999
 Paralaoma raricostata (Suter, 1890)
 Paralaoma regia Powell, 1948
 Paralaoma retinoides (Tate, 1894)
 Paralaoma sarawakensis Marzuki, T. S. Liew & Mohd-Azlan, 2021
 † Paralaoma senex B. A. Marshall & Worthy, 2017 
 Paralaoma sericata (Suter, 1890)
 Paralaoma serratocostata (Webster, 1906)
 Paralaoma servilis (Shuttleworth, 1852)
 Paralaoma textilis (Pilsbry, 1920)
 † Paralaoma thomsoni (Suter, 1917) 
 Paralaoma turbotti Powell, 1948

Synonyms
 Paralaoma abjecta Iredale, 1944: synonym of Semilaoma abjecta (Iredale, 1944) (original combination)
 Paralaoma angustum Vermeulen, Liew & Schilthuizen, 2015: synonym of Paralaoma angusta Vermeulen, Liew & Schilthuizen, 2015 (incorrect gender ending)
 Paralaoma caputspinulae (Reeve, 1852): synonym of Paralaoma servilis (Shuttleworth, 1852) (junior synonym)
 Paralaoma decresensis Iredale, 1937: synonym of Paralaoma caputspinulae (Reeve, 1852): synonym of Paralaoma servilis (Shuttleworth, 1852) (junior synonym)
 Paralaoma duncombei Iredale, 1945: synonym of Paralaoma caputspinulae (Reeve, 1852): synonym of Paralaoma servilis (Shuttleworth, 1852) (junior synonym)
 Paralaoma lidgbirdensis Iredale, 1944: synonym of Semilaoma lidgbirdensis (Iredale, 1944) (original combination)
 Paralaoma orestias Preston, 1913: synonym of Christianoconcha orestias (Preston, 1913) (original combination)
 Paralaoma pumila (Hutton, 1882): synonym of Paralaoma servilis (Shuttleworth, 1852)
 Paralaoma raoulensis Iredale, 1913: synonym of Paralaoma servilis (Shuttleworth, 1852) (junior synonym)
 Paralaoma royi Iredale, 1944: synonym of Paralaoma servilis (Shuttleworth, 1852) (junior synonym)
 Paralaoma stabilis Iredale, 1937: synonym of Paralaoma caputspinulae (Reeve, 1852): synonym of Paralaoma servilis (Shuttleworth, 1852) (junior synonym)

References

 Powell, A.W.B. (1939). The Mollusca of Stewart Island. Records of the Auckland Institute and Museum 2: 211–238.
 AnimalBase page for this genus at:

External links 
 
 Iredale, T. (1913). The land Mollusca of the Kermadec islands. Proceedings of the Malacological Society of London. 10(6): 364-388, pl. 18

 
Gastropod genera
Taxa named by Tom Iredale
Gastropods described in 1913